NGC 81 is a lenticular galaxy estimated to be about 270 million light-years away in the constellation of Andromeda.

References

External links
 

0081
001352
Andromeda (constellation)
18731115
Lenticular galaxies